{{Infobox university 
|image_name   =IberoPuebla.png
|image_size   = 175 px
|name         = Ibero-American University Puebla
|native_name  = Universidad Iberoamericana Puebla
|motto        = La verdad nos hará libres 
|mottoeng     = Truth shall set us free
|type         = Jesuit, Catholic 
|established  = 1983
| religious_affiliation = Roman Catholic (Jesuit)
| academic_affiliation  = SUJ AUSJAL
|rector       = Mario Ernesto Patrón Sánchez
|students     = 4,191
|endowment    = 
|undergrad    = 3358
|postgrad     = 833
|faculty      = 
|city         = San Andrés Cholula
|state        = Puebla
|country      = Mexico
|campus       = Urban 
|colors       = Red  and  White
|mascot       = Wild goose
|website      = IberoPuebla
}}

The Ibero-American University Puebla (in Spanish: Universidad Iberoamericana Puebla, abbreviated UIA but commonly known as Ibero'') is a Mexican private institution of higher education sponsored by the Society of Jesus.  A spin-off from the main campus located in Mexico City, the Puebla campus was built in response to interest in a Jesuit institution in Puebla State. The university has grown to become an important university for the students in the Southern region of Mexico. It exceeds in enrollment the campuses in León and Torreón. It currently offers a high school program, as well as several undergraduate and postgraduate programs.

Academics
Ibero Puebla is known for academic excellence in engineering, architecture, design, computing, business, humanities, environmental studies and communication. Ibero Puebla has six departments and offers more than 31 undergraduate degrees. The university offers an exchange program for international students with subjects taught in Spanish. During summer Ibero Puebla offers Spanish language programs. Ibero Puebla offers high school programs in three states and also offers graduate degrees.

High school
Beginning in 2009, Universidad Iberoamericana Puebla has been developing its high school programs. The first high school was opened in 2007 and, subsequently, two more high schools were opened in the states of Veracruz and Tlaxcala.
Prepa Ibero Puebla
Prepa Ibero Tlaxcala

Undergraduate programs

    
Architecture, Arts and Design Department
Architecture
Graphic Design
Textile Design
Interaction Design and Digital Animation
Industrial Design

Economics and Business Department
Business Administration
Accounting and Financial Strategies
International Trade
Economy and Finance
Human Resources Division
Marketing
Tourism Management and Hospitality

Interdisciplinary program in Environment
Environmental Sciences and Sustainable Development
Sciences for the Human Development Department
Educative Processes
Psychology
  
 
Sciences and Engineering Department
Electronics and Communications Engineering
Industrial Engineering
Mechanical and Electrical Engineering
Computer Systems Engineering
Nutrition and Food Science
Mechatronics Engineering
Business Engineering
Logistics Engineering
Automotive Engineering
Civil Engineering
Gastronomy

Social Sciences and Humanities Department
Communication
Political Science and Public Administration
Law
International Relations
Literature and Philosophy

Postgraduate programs
     
Architecture, Arts and Design Department
Specialty in Digital Design
Specialty in Cultural Management
Master in Cultural Management 
Master in Management and Sustainable Urban Design

Economics and Business Department
Master in Industrial Enterprise Management
Master in Management and Human Resource Strategies
Master in Management and Financial Strategies
Master in Management and International Marketing

Environment Department
Master in Regional Studies, Environment and Development
Ph.D. in Development, Environment and Territory

Health Sciences Department
Specialty in Addictions Prevention
Clinical Nutrition
Psychotherapy
Human Development
  
Humanities Department
Master in Basic Literacy Education
Master in Mathematics for Basic Education
Master in New Technologies for Learning
Master in Competency Based Learning
Master in Latin American literature
Ph.D. in Education

Sciences and Engineering Department
Specialty in Engineering and Quality Management
Master in Enterprise Systems Engineering
Master in Engineering and Quality Management

Social Sciences Department
Master in Constitutional Law and Amparo
Master in Business Law
Master in Tax Law
Master in Public Policy
Master in Management of Social Economy Companies

Sports
The Ibero has sport facilities for use of its students. The university takes part in various competitions in some of Mexico's most popular college sports. The mascot of the school is the wild goose. The story goes that on a cloudy afternoon, a flock of geese passed the school campus while migrating south. One of them, flying wounded, landed to rest in the lake of the Ibero Puebla accompanied by two of his companions. It was then that a Jesuit priest, fond of birds, noticed the three geese and decided to find out more about these animals, finding that they are intelligent animals that work as a team.

See also
 Association of Jesuit Colleges and Universities
 List of alumni of Jesuit educational institutions
 List of Jesuit sites
 Universidad Iberoamericana
 Instituto Tecnológico y de Estudios Superiores de Occidente

References

External links

Official website
UIA Campus in Leon
UIA Campus in Puebla
UIA Campus in Tijuana

Universidad Iberoamericana
Universities and colleges in Puebla